Dumbledore's Army (or D.A. for short) is a fictional student organisation in J. K. Rowling's Harry Potter series that is founded by the main characters, Harry Potter, Ron Weasley and Hermione Granger, to stand up against the regime of Hogwarts High Inquisitor Dolores Umbridge, as well as to learn practical Defence Against the Dark Arts. It was founded in the fifth book, Harry Potter and the Order of the Phoenix.

Synopsis

History
In Harry Potter and the Order of the Phoenix, the new Defence Against the Dark Arts professor, Dolores Umbridge, chooses to teach only the basic theoretical principles of the subject in her classes instead of practical applications, due to Minister of Magic Cornelius Fudge's erroneous fear that Albus Dumbledore is preparing to assemble a student army to overthrow him. This theory-only approach is widely unpopular among the students, especially those characters like Harry, who are in their fifth year and have to take their O.W.L. exams on the subject later in the year. Harry also believes that lack of practical experience makes them more vulnerable to Lord Voldemort's forces, though the Ministry staunchly refuses to accept that Lord Voldemort has returned. This prompts Hermione Granger to suggest founding a student group where Harry would teach practical Defence Against the Dark Arts.

After Umbridge learns about the project, she bans all unapproved student organisations, so meetings are secretly held in the Room of Requirement and announced to members through the use of enchanted fake Galleons created by Hermione. Cho Chang suggests the "Defence Association", shortened to "D.A.", as the official name for the group, but Ginny Weasley's suggestion of "Dumbledore's Army", to mock the Ministry's paranoia and to show the group's loyalty to Dumbledore, is chosen.

When Cho's friend Marietta Edgecombe betrays the group to Umbridge (Cho herself while under the influence of the truth potion Veritaserum in the film), Marietta is cursed with pimples on her face as a result of Hermione's casting a spell on the D.A. membership list. Later on, to prevent Harry's expulsion and the incrimination of other members, Dumbledore claims responsibility for organising the group, then escapes when Ministry officials attempt to arrest him. Though the D.A. stops meeting following these events, three members — Ginny, Neville and Luna — join Harry, Ron and Hermione in the battle in the Department of Mysteries towards the end of the fifth book. In Harry Potter and the Half-Blood Prince, Neville and Luna are distraught due to the fact that the D.A. no longer exists. When Hogwarts is invaded by Death Eaters, they are among the members who join the Order of the Phoenix in the ensuing battle.

In Harry Potter and the Deathly Hallows, with Harry, Ron and Hermione absent from Hogwarts, Neville, Ginny and Luna begin a covert rebellion against new headmaster Severus Snape by reactivating the D.A. However, Luna is abducted at Christmas and Ginny leaves during Easter, leaving Neville for a few weeks as the D.A.'s leader. Neville tells Harry that most of the D.A.'s activity ceased shortly after Michael Corner was tortured by Death Eater siblings Alecto and Amycus Carrow for trying to rescue a first-year boy from imprisonment. The group thereafter hide from the Death Eaters in the Room of Requirement, using a secret passage to the Hog's Head to find food. The D.A. believed that if Harry returned he would lead them in a revolution against Snape and the Carrows and are disappointed when he initially refuses to let them help. Harry does lead an impromptu revolt, but only himself, Luna and Professors McGonagall, Sprout, Flitwick and Slughorn take part in it, with Harry and Luna taking out the Carrows, and the professors (rallied by McGonagall and Harry) driving off Snape. In the book's climax, the D.A. (alongside the Order of the Phoenix) plays an important role in the Battle of Hogwarts, giving Harry enough time to find the remaining Horcruxes.

In the play Harry Potter and the Cursed Child, an alternate timeline is created in which Voldemort has won the Battle of Hogwarts, killed Harry and triumphed over the wizarding world. Ron and Hermione maintained the last remnants of the D.A. Twenty years later, they still wage hopeless resistance against the all-powerful Voldemort, clandestinely helped by Snape – in this reality still alive and still teaching at Hogwarts. Eventually, these remnants of the D.A. sacrifice themselves to cover the escape of Scorpius Malfoy and let him restore the timeline where Harry wins.

Members

Notable Dumbledore's Army members

Lavender Brown
Lavender Brown is a Gryffindor student in Harry's year. She is a close friend of housemate Parvati Patil, and the two also seem to have a reasonably close relationship with Professor Trelawney, comforting and supporting her in her various crises. In Order of the Phoenix, she initially believes the Ministry's smear campaign against Harry, but is among the original members of Dumbledore's Army. In Half-Blood Prince, Lavender becomes Ron's first girlfriend for several months; he relishes the opportunity to make Hermione jealous and prove that he can  snog people whenever he wants. It becomes increasingly evident that Ron is not particularly enamoured with Lavender and actually finds her irritating. Lavender becomes jealous of Ron's friendship with Hermione, and finally splits up with him when she sees them leaving Harry's dormitory together, as she is under the impression that they had been alone together, not realising Harry was there under his invisibility cloak. In Deathly Hallows, during the Battle of Hogwarts, Lavender is attacked by Fenrir Greyback, who is repelled by a crystal ball hurled by Professor Trelawney. Deathly Hallows – Part 2 depicts her as explicitly dying from the attack, while her fate is never made clear for the context of the books.

Jennifer Smith portrayed Lavender in a brief non-speaking role in Prisoner of Azkaban. Jessie Cave played the character in a larger role from Half-Blood Prince onwards.

Cho Chang
Cho Chang is a Ravenclaw student one year above Harry, and is the Seeker for the Ravenclaw Quidditch team. She is Harry's first love interest, is described as being "very pretty" with long dark hair and is frequently accompanied by a group of giggling girls. In Goblet of Fire, Harry's crush on Cho intensifies and he works up the courage to ask her out to the Yule Ball, one of the necessary events in the Triwizard Tournament, but Cho apologises and replies that she had previously accepted Cedric Diggory's offer. Nonetheless, Cho is still kind to Harry, much to his relief, and she refuses to wear one of Draco Malfoy's "Potter Stinks" badges. She and Cedric maintain their relationship until he is murdered by Peter Pettigrew on Voldemort's orders.

Cho is one of the first students to believe Harry's declaration of Voldemort's return in Order of the Phoenix, and when invited by Hermione to join the D.A., she joins because she is determined to fight against Voldemort and avenge Cedric's murder. Cho initiates a kiss under the mistletoe with Harry after the last D.A. session before the Christmas holidays; much to Ron's amusement, Harry describes the kiss as "wet," but then explains that Cho was crying. Harry and Cho go out on a date on Valentine's Day, but her sustained grief over Cedric's death, her jealousy over Harry's friendship with Hermione, and Harry's lack of knowledge about girls all make for a miserable experience. Their relationship ends when the D.A. is exposed following  Marietta Edgecombe's betrayal of the group to Umbridge. Cho defends her friend's actions by saying that Marietta simply made a mistake. After the last Quidditch match, Cho begins dating Michael Corner.

In the series finale, Cho demonstrates her loyalty to Hogwarts when she returns to join other D.A. members in hiding in the Room of Requirement prior to engaging in the Battle of Hogwarts; Harry and Cho, united by a common cause, appear on amicable and friendly terms. She shares with Harry the little information known about Ravenclaw's diadem (one of Voldemort's Horcruxes). Rowling said during an October 2007 book signing that Cho marries a Muggle. 

Cho, who is described in UK media as a British Asian character, was played by Scottish actress Katie Leung in the film series starting from the character's debut in Harry Potter and the Goblet of Fire. In the Order of the Phoenix film, she exposes Dumbledore's Army to Umbridge while under the influence of Veritaserum, whereas in the novel the betrayal is willfully carried out by Marietta Edgecombe. Rowling has been criticized for perpetuating stereotypes of East Asians through Cho's name and shallow characterization.

Colin and Dennis Creevey
Colin and Dennis Creevey are two Muggle-born brothers sorted into Gryffindor; Colin is in Ginny's year, and Dennis is two years younger than Colin. Both are delighted at the discovery that they are wizards, and are star-struck by Harry. Colin takes photographs of memorable people, objects and events to send home to his family. Colin's camera later proves to be a lifesaver when he attempts to take a picture of the basilisk, and the camera lens shields him from the creature's direct and fatal eye contact, and Colin is only petrified. Despite being too young to take part in the Battle of Hogwarts, Colin sneaks back into the castle to participate, and dies in combat.

Hugh Mitchell played Colin in the film version of Chamber of Secrets, and voiced the character in the Order of the Phoenix video game. Dennis never appeared in any of the films. In the Goblet of Fire and subsequent films, the roles of Colin and Dennis were morphed into a second-year character named Nigel Wolpert, portrayed by William Melling.

Seamus Finnigan
Seamus Finnigan is an Irish Gryffindor student in Harry's year who is described as having sandy hair. His mother is a witch and his father a Muggle, who only found out his wife's secret after their marriage. His best friend is Dean Thomas, whom he is housemates with. In Order of the Phoenix, Seamus is initially influenced by the Ministry's smear campaign against Harry, and his mother nearly prevents him from returning to Hogwarts. However, he later realises his mistake, offers his apologies to Harry, and becomes a late addition to the D.A. In Half-Blood Prince, Seamus refuses to allow his mother to take him home before Dumbledore's funeral. In Deathly Hallows, it is stated that Seamus is taking shelter in the Room of Requirement along with several D.A. members; his face is bruised so badly after being punished by the Carrows that Harry initially fails to recognise him until he speaks. During the battle, he, Luna, and Ernie help Harry fight the Dementors by conjuring their respective Patronuses. He is last seen entering the Great Hall to take part in the final stage of the battle, when Harry shields him and Hannah Abbott from one of Voldemort's curses.

Devon Murray played Seamus in the Harry Potter film series and voiced the character in the eighth game. He has appeared in all eight films, one of the few characters to do so.  A recurring theme is a tendency to cause items to explode when casting spells.  This is recognised by Professor McGonagall who asks him to use his talent to bring down a connecting bridge during the battle of Hogwarts.

Parvati Patil
Parvati Patil is a Gryffindor student in Harry's year and the twin sister of Ravenclaw student Padma Patil. Her best friend is Lavender Brown; they are particularly fond of Trelawney's Divination class, and share many common interests. In Goblet of Fire, when Harry needs a date to the Yule Ball, he asks Parvati and she accepts. However, her evening is a disappointment as Harry spends the evening jealously preoccupied over Cho's date with Cedric and disdains dancing with Parvati; she eventually abandons him to dance with a Beauxbatons boy whom she then later meets in Hogsmeade. In her fifth year, Parvati joins Dumbledore's Army along with her sister. In Half-Blood Prince, the twins are almost removed from Hogwarts by their parents, and ultimately do return home after Dumbledore's death. However, the Patil twins return to their seventh year at Hogwarts, and participate in the Battle of Hogwarts.

The Patils' names and appearance in the films imply that they are of Indian descent. Patil is a common Marathi surname in the state of Maharashtra, India. Parvati means 'daughter of the mountains', a name for the Hindu goddess Parvati, the goddess of fertility, while Padma is the Sanskrit word for lotus, an alternate name for the Hindu goddess Lakshmi, the goddess of prosperity. Together, they form a part of the trinity of the Hindu goddesses.

Parvati was portrayed by Sitara Shah in Prisoner of Azkaban. Shefali Chowdhury took over the part for Goblet of Fire, along with the film and game versions of Order of the Phoenix and Half-Blood Prince.

Dean Thomas
Dean Thomas is a Gryffindor student in Harry's year, and is Seamus Finnigan's best friend. He is a Half-blood: his mother is a Muggle and his father was a pure blood wizard who kept his blood status a secret. Dean's father left his family when Dean was very young in an attempt to protect them against the Death Eaters, and was slain when he refused to join them. Dean originally prefers football over Quidditch, and has a West Ham United poster in his dormitory. Dean was subsequently raised by his mother and stepfather, and has several half-brothers and sisters. Dean was named "Gary" in the original drafts of Philosopher's Stone. Rowling omitted his physical description ("a black boy taller than Ron") from the British version of the book following her editor's request to reduce the length of the chapter, but it was included in the American edition. His backstory was originally expanded in Chamber of Secrets, but she ultimately cut it due to her inability to work it into the storyline.

In Order of the Phoenix, Dean joins the D.A. and also believes Harry and Dumbledore when they insist that Voldemort has returned; but, when Harry and Seamus engage in a heated row over the Daily Prophets allegations that Harry had merely fabricated the story, Dean refuses to take sides. At the end of the term, he begins seeing Ginny Weasley. The two of them are still dating in Half-Blood Prince, but Ginny thinks that Dean is being pushy and overprotective, which leads to the fight that ends their relationship. Dean temporarily fills in for Katie Bell on the Gryffindor Quidditch team after she is hospitalised. Dean's role is expanded in Deathly Hallows. Unable to prove that he is actually a half-blood, he does not return to Hogwarts and goes on the run from the Ministry, who are rounding up Muggle-borns upon Voldemort's orders. Harry, Ron, and Hermione first come across him during their mission as they eavesdrop on his conversation with fellow runaways Ted Tonks, Dirk Cresswell, and the goblins Griphook and Gornuk. Snatchers soon viciously attack the group; Dean and Griphook are the lone survivors but are captured along with Harry, Ron, and Hermione and taken to Malfoy Manor. They are all rescued by Dobby, who transports them to Bill and Fleur's Shell Cottage for protection. Dean returns to Hogwarts towards the end of the book and fights in the Battle of Hogwarts, battling with Parvati Patil against Antonin Dolohov.

Alfred Enoch played Dean in the Harry Potter film series and voiced the character in the Order of the Phoenix and Deathly Hallows: Part 1 video game.

Reception and significance 
The group has been analyzed as a metonym and as a fictional example of student activism and inspirational educational practices.

Real world impact
The goal of Dumbledore's Army inspired actor/comedian Andrew Slack, a Harry Potter fan, to create a group called Harry Potter Alliance to highlight the crisis in Sudan and social inequalities. In an interview, Slack compared Harry and the D.A. to Darfur, claiming, "With both the Ministry of Magic and the Daily Prophet (the Wizarding World's mainstream news source) in denial that Voldemort has returned and evil is afoot, Harry and his underground rebel group, 'Dumbledore's Army,' work with the adult group, 'The Order of the Phoenix,' to awake the world into peace."

References

Fictional revolutionary organizations
Fictional secret societies
Harry Potter organisations
Lists of fictional children